SAS Amatola (F145) is the first of four  frigates for the South African Navy by the European South African Corvette Consortium.

Amatola, in keeping with a naming convention depicting acts of valour, was named after the Amatola mountain range in the Eastern Cape area where British forces fought the Xhosa nation in late 1852. Mrs Zanele Mbeki (wife of then President Thabo Mbeki), named the vessel at the Blohm & Voss Thyssen Rheinstahl, Howaldtswerke Deutsche Werft (HDW) and Thales shipyards in Germany just after noon on 7 June 2002.

Construction
The vessels of the class were manufactured by the European South African Corvette Consortium (ESACC), consisting of the German Frigate Consortium (Blohm+Voss, Thyssen Rheinstahl and Howaldtswerke Deutsche Werft), African Defence Systems (part of the French Thales defence group) and a number of South African companies.

The ships were built to the MEKO modular design concept, and are designated by the manufacturer as the MEKO A-200SAN class. Some controversy exists as to the class type of the vessel, with both the manufacturer and the South African Navy referring to her as a "corvette", but other similar vessels in other navies being referred to as frigates. Some have claimed that the use of the word "corvette" was a political decision made by the South African government to ease criticism of the procurement of the vessels.

SAS Amatola was built at the Blohm + Voss shipyards in Hamburg, Germany, and she arrived in South Africa on 4 June 2003. She was next fitted out with her various weapons and electronic systems, and weapons integration trials were begun in October 2004. This was followed by the warship's commissioning on 16 February 2006.

On 7 April 2006 Amatola arrived from Kiel after accompanying the submarine  to Simon's Town on her maiden voyage.

Notable Deployments

During 2007, this vessel became the first South African frigate in decades to take part in the Royal Navy's Basic Operational Sea Training (BOST) programme, however without any embarked Super Lynx 300 helicopters, since these had not been delivered by the Westland company at the time.

References

External links

 SAS Amatola AIS data and location

Ships built in Hamburg
Valour-class frigates
2002 ships
Frigates of the South African Navy
Military units and formations in Cape Town